Rawalpindi Ring Road also known as Rawalpindi–Islamabad Ring Road, is a 38.3 kilometer orbital highway in Pakistan between the cities of Rawalpindi and Islamabad. Work on the highway started in March 2022, it is currently under construction, upon completion the highway will have six lanes. The ring road will start from Channi Sher Alam bridge near Rawat and end near Thalian interchange close to the  Lahore-Islamabad Motorway. The project was originally proposed in 1991, under the government of Nawaz Sharif, however due to political turmoil the project never materialized. During Shahbaz Sharif's visit to China in 2010 as Chief Minister of Punjab, the project was discussed between Pakistani and Chinese authorities to secure funding. In 2017, the project was again briefed to the Asian Development Bank to secure funding for the project.

Overview

Islamabad–Rawalpindi metropolitan area, consisting of the twin cities of Islamabad & Rawalpindi, is the third largest populated metropolitan area in Pakistan. The twin cities are connected to the major economic centers of Pakistan through N-5 National Highway, an important bottleneck on the route of the national highway is the main city area of Rawalpindi, the Rawalpindi Ring Road, also known as the R3 project, was initiated to ease the flow of traffic.

Route Redirection Scandal

In 2018, a fresh Project concept (PC-1) was feasibility report was undertaken by the Punjab Government, due to the previously conducted feasibility reports deemed old. In April 2021, the bidding process was put on hold and  Prime Minister Imran Khan ordered an inquiry into the alleged route change of the project to benefit privet housing schemes and government officials. The country's top anti graft body NAB also took notice of the alleged scam and initiand and inquiry. The main opposition party called for the removal of Chief Minister Usman Buzdar, Special Assistant to Prime Minister Zulfi Bukhari & Federal Aviation minister Ghulam Sarwar Khan as the main beneficiaries of the scam.

Special Assistant to Prim Minister on Overseas Pakistani's and Human Resource Development, Zulfi Bhukari, resigned on 17th May from his position, citing the allegation of scam against him.

References

Highways in Pakistan